USS Wintle (DE-25) was an  constructed for the United States Navy during World War II. It was promptly sent off into the Pacific Ocean to protect convoys and other ships from Japanese submarines and fighter aircraft. By the end of the war, when she returned to the United States, she was awarded three battle stars.

Namesake
Jack William Wintle was born on 18 April 1908 in Pittsburg, Kansas. He was appointed a midshipman at the United States Naval Academy on 14 June 1928 and graduated on 2 June 1932. In the summer of 1939, he received postgraduate instruction at the Naval Academy before reporting for duty at the Philadelphia Navy Yard to help prepare  for recommissioning and service on the Neutrality Patrol. His tour of duty in that destroyer, one of the first in the Atlantic Squadrons to be fitted with sonar, ended in August 1940 when he was sent to New Orleans, Louisiana, where he served almost two years instructing NROTC midshipmen.

Late in April 1942, he reported to the Bureau of Navigation in Washington where he learned that his next assignment was to be aide and flag lieutenant to the Commander, South Pacific Area and South Pacific Force. On 15 June 1942 he was promoted to lieutenant commander and, four days later, reported for duty in his new assignment in the South Pacific. He served under Rear Admiral Daniel J. Callaghan, Chief of Staff to the Commander South Pacific Area and South Pacific Force, through the early months of the Guadalcanal campaign in late 1942. Late in October 1942, when Callaghan went to sea as the commander of a cruiser-destroyer force, Wintle joined him on his flagship  as a member of his staff.

On the night of 12 and 13 November during the Battle of Savo Island, San Francisco suffered a terrific pounding from Imperial Japanese Navy ships, several Japanese salvos scored on its superstructure, obliterating her flag and navigating bridges. All but one member of the admiral's staff were killed, and Wintle was among the casualties. He was posthumously awarded the Navy Cross.

Construction and commissioning
Wintle was laid down on 1 October 1942 at the Mare Island Navy Yard as BDE-25, one of the destroyer escorts allocated to the Royal Navy under the lend-lease program; launched on 18 February 1943; sponsor unknown (Lt. Comdr. Wintle's widow sponsored DE-266 which ship carried the name Wintle at the time BDE-25 was launched); reallocated to the United States Navy on 4 June 1943; named Wintle on 14 June 1943 when DE-266 was allocated to the Royal Navy as her replacement; and commissioned on 10 July 1943.

World War II Pacific Theater operations

Wintle completed shakedown training in late July and early August and returned to the Mare Island Navy Yard for post-shakedown repairs. On 21 September, she put to sea with a Hawaii-bound convoy and arrived at Pearl Harbor on 8 October. She departed Oahu, Hawaii, almost immediately to return home in the screen of another convoy on 17 October. She delivered her charges at Nandi Harbor on 14 November and, after a three-day stopover, departed Viti Levu on 17 November to escort  to Funafuti in the Ellice Islands. She stopped there for two days before returning to sea on the 21st to escort  to a fueling rendezvous. When she returned to Funafuti the following day, "Operation Galvanic", the Gilbert Islands invasion, was well underway. All the destroyer escort's recent movements and those she made over the following fortnight were undertaken to support the warships participating in that campaign. On 8 December, Wintle completed her labors in behalf of "Galvanic" and set a course for Funafuti where she stopped between 9 and 12 December before continuing on toward Oahu in the screen for a convoy.

Wintle involved in collision

The warship arrived in Pearl Harbor on 21 December. After several days in port, she began battle practice training in the Hawaiian operating area. On 3 January 1944, Wintle and  came alongside one another to practice fueling at sea. After transferring about 1,000 gallons of fuel to Wintle, Dempsey prepared to leave. Suddenly, she rammed Wintle on her starboard side. Her anchor ripped open Wintle's starboard side from the lower platform deck to the main deck at frame 40. Dempsey's anchor also broke Wintle's degaussing coil and severed her return steam line. In her haste to change course, Dempsey swerved sharply, colliding with Wintle again, this time stern to stern, crushing Wintle's propeller guard against her hull. The damaged destroyer escort's repair party quickly stuffed mattresses into the breach in her hull and shored them up as best they could to prevent serious flooding. Wintle was able to make 10 knots without shipping too much water and reached Pearl Harbor the following morning to begin repairs. She completed repairs rapidly and returned to sea to resume exercises on 11 January.

Supporting the invasion of the Marshall Islands

Ten days later, Wintle received orders assigning her to the 5th Amphibious Force for "Operation Flintlock", the invasion of the Marshall Islands. She departed Pearl Harbor that same day escorting four tank landing ships to Majuro. Wintle and her charges reached that atoll on 1 February to find that the American force had taken it without opposition the previous day. The destroyer escort led the patrol of the entrance of the lagoon on the 2nd, then met  at sea, and escorted her into the lagoon on the 3rd. She then resumed anti-submarine warfare (ASW) patrol off Majuro and continued the task for the next six days. On the 9th and 10th, she escorted  to Kwajalein, then headed back to Pearl Harbor, where she arrived on the 23rd. They saw their charges safely to the Gilberts on 11 March and got underway the following day for the Solomons. Proceeding via Funafuti, the two destroyer escorts arrived off Lunga Point, Guadalcanal, on 18 March and reported for duty with the 3rd Fleet. For the next six months, Wintle crisscrossed the Southwest Pacific escorting tankers, transports, and cargo-men to and from various American bases, most frequently between the Solomons and the Admiralty Islands. When not engaged in escort missions, she honed her ASW skills during exercises with American submarines.
 
On 19 September, she arrived at Manus Island concluding her last Solomons-Admiralties run. On the 22d, she headed out of Seeadler Harbor for a new theater, the Palau Islands in the Central Pacific. The warship arrived in the anchorage at Kossol Passage three days later. Her stay proved brief because she set course back to Manus that same day. She reached Seeadler Harbor on 5 October and, after a brief availability alongside , headed back to the Palaus where she arrived on 15 October. During the following month, Wintle performed patrol and escort duties in the Palaus.

Operating on the Saipan Patrol

The destroyer escort exited Kossol Passage on 18 November and steamed via Ulithi to the Marianas. She entered Apra Harbor, Guam, on the 28th and became a unit of the Saipan Patrol and Escort Force. For about 12 weeks, the warship patrolled the Marianas, primarily between Guam and Saipan. On Christmas night, she helped to repulse a Japanese air raid on U.S. Army Air Force installations ashore on Saipan. Two days later, she rescued three survivors from a B-29 bomber that crashed near Nafutan Point. After the excitement of late December, January 1945 was uneventful except for two round-trip voyages to Eniwetok and back.
 
On 5 February 1945, she received orders transferring her to the Marshalls-Gilberts Escort Force. She arrived at Eniwetok on 10 February and began duty escorting convoys from bases in the Marshalls and Gilberts to forward areas. She made frequent voyages between Guam, Kwajalein, and Eniwetok and cruised with a hunter-killer group in search of Japanese submarines reportedly operating in the Marshalls. On the night of 2 April, Wintle exchanged gunfire with Japanese shore batteries on bypassed Wotje Atoll after they opened fire on her while she hunted for a midget submarine. During American air strikes on enemy-held Mili, Jaluit, and Wotje in late April and early May, Wintle provided air-sea rescue services; but, fortunately, no aviator needed her assistance. On the night of 5 and 6 May, she covered the evacuation of natives from Japanese-held Jaluit Atoll. On 13 May, Wintle departed Eniwetok to screen two merchant ships on a voyage to the Palaus.
 
Wintle arrived in Kossol Passage on the 18th and, two days later, headed for Ulithi. The ships departed Ulithi on 25 May and made Eniwetok on the 29th. There, the destroyer escort resumed patrol and escort duties with the Marshalls-Gilberts Escort Force which she continued to perform until mid-June.

Antisubmarine patrol operations

On 17 June, Wintle and  stood out of Eniwetok to take up ASW station on the shipping lanes between Eniwetok and the Marianas. The next day, she responded to a report that  had been torpedoed but, upon reaching the repair ship, found no submarine to attack. After an unsuccessful search, she headed back to Eniwetok. Wintle returned to Eniwetok where she took on fuel and supplies in preparation for the long voyage back to the United States. The destroyer escort exited the lagoon on 12 July, visited Pearl Harbor on the 18th and 19th, and entered San Francisco Bay on the 26th.

Post-War activity

The ship unloaded ammunition at the Mare Island Navy Yard and entered Hunters Point, California, for repairs that same day. She was in drydock on 15 August when news of the Japanese capitulation arrived; and, on the 18th, most work ceased.

Post-War deactivation
Finally, on 15 November 1945, Wintle was placed out of commission and was berthed at Mare Island, California. On 28 November 1945, her name was struck from the Navy List. The former warship was sold for scrap to the Union Minerals & Alloys Corporation on 25 August 1947.

Awards

References

External links

 

Evarts-class destroyer escorts
Ships built in Vallejo, California
1943 ships
World War II frigates and destroyer escorts of the United States